Adam Mahomed Habib (born 1965) is a South African academic administrator serving as Director of the School of Oriental and African Studies, University of London since 1 January 2021. He served as Vice-Chancellor and Principal of the University of the Witwatersrand (Wits) in Johannesburg, South Africa between 1 June 2013, when the term of his predecessor Loyiso Nongxa ended, and 1 January 2021. He is also a former deputy vice-chancellor of the University of Johannesburg.

Career

Studying at a mix of South African and American universities, Habib graduated as a political scientist having received his Bachelor and Master of Arts degrees from the University of KwaZulu-Natal, Bachelor of Arts (Honours) from the University of Witwatersrand, and his MPhil and PhD from the Graduate School of the City University of New York.  He has held academic appointments at the Universities of Durban-Westville and KwaZulu-Natal and the Human Sciences Research Council. Prior to being appointed Deputy Vice-Chancellor Research, Innovation and Advancement at the University of Johannesburg, he served as the Executive Director of the Democracy and Governance Programme of the Human Science Research Council. Before that, he was the founding director of the Centre for Civil Society and a research professor in the School of Development Studies at the University of KwaZulu-Natal.
 
Habib has served as co-editor of both the social science academic journal Transformation and the official disciplinary journal of the South African Association of Political Science, Politkon. He also sits on the editorial boards of Voluntas and the South African Labour Bulletin. He has served as an external examiner and examined Master's and Doctoral dissertations for a number of South African Universities including Durban-Westville, KwaZulu-Natal, Witwatersrand, Cape Town, and Rhodes. He has also served on a number of boards and councils including those of the University of Durban-Westville, the Durban University of Technology, the International Society for Third-Sector Research, Sangonet, the Centre for Public Participation, and the Centre for Policy Studies.

Habib has published numerous edited books, book chapters and journal articles in the thematic areas of democratisation and its consolidation in South Africa, contemporary social movements, philanthropy, giving and its impact on poverty alleviation and development, institutional reform, changing identities and their evolution in the post-apartheid era, and South Africa's role in Africa and beyond. He is a well-known public figure in South Africa whose opinions are often sought by both the print and broadcast media.

In December 2012, the University of the Witwatersrand invited Habib to be that institution's next vice-chancellor.

In February 2020, it was announced that Habib would succeed Valerie Amos as director of the School of Oriental and African Studies, University of London as of 1 January 2021. In March 2021, Habib stepped aside from his position, as an investigation was launched into his uttering of a racial slur during an online meeting with a group of students, when he was responding to a question about university policy on the use of the word. He subsequently apologised for his use of the term in the meeting, and was later cleared by an independent external investigation, and allowed to resume his duties.

Barred entry to the United States
In October 2006, while on a trip with colleagues from the Human Sciences Research Council, Habib was deported when he flew into John F. Kennedy Airport in the US. Habib had studied in New York, and he had made numerous trips to New York previously. His wife and young children were also banned from the US.

According to  a November 2007 The New York Times article, the US informed Habib he had been barred entry over allegations of "engaging in terrorist activities",
and  The Christian Science Monitor reported that he had been barred due to having “links to terrorism".

The American Civil Liberties Union (ACLU) tried to aid Habib in learning the reasons why he was barred.
Upon the release of the justification, the ACLU shifted its effort to get the evidence supporting the allegation, if any, released.

On 20 January 2010, the American State Department decided, in a document signed by Secretary of State Hillary Clinton, to lift the ban that prohibited Habib (as well as Tariq Ramadan from Switzerland) from entering the United States.

Works
 
 Adam Habib: Rebels and Rage. Reflecting on #FeesMustFall. Jonathan Ball Publishers, 2019.

References

"Habib Files", The Art of Accomplishment, University of Johannesburg.

External links

"'Violence Is the Product of the Polarized Nature of Our Society'–South African Scholar Adam Habib on Killing of White Supremacist Leader", 5 April 2010 – video by Democracy Now!

1965 births
Living people
Vice-Chancellors of the University of the Witwatersrand
People deported from the United States
South African people of Indian descent
Academic staff of the University of the Witwatersrand
People from Pietermaritzburg
City University of New York alumni